Emil Svensk  (born 12 July 1993) is a Swedish orienteering competitor. He was born in Borlänge. He won a gold medal in the middle distance at the 2013 Junior World Orienteering Championships. At the 2018 European Orienteering Championships in Cadempino he won a silver medal in the mixed sprint relay with the Swedish team. He competed at the 2018 World Orienteering Championships in Latvia, where he placed sixth in the sprint final, and won a gold medal in the mixed sprint relay, together with Karolin Ohlsson, Jonas Leandersson and Tove Alexandersson. In the 2019 World Orienteering Championships in Norway he participated in the winning Swedish relay team. His biggest individual success was the gold medal in the sprint distance at the 2021 European Orienteering Championships in Neuchâtel

Achievements 

 EOC 2018 Silver medal in mixed sprint relay
 WOC 2018 6th place in the sprint final
 WOC 2018 Gold Medal in the mixed sprint relay
 WOC 2019 Gold Medal in the Swedish relay team
 WOC 2021 Gold Medal in the Swedish mixed sprint relay team
 EOC 2021 Gold Medal in the sprint final
 JWOC 2013 middle gold medal
 Jukola 2019 1st place with Stora Tuna OK

References

External links 

Swedish orienteers
Male orienteers
1993 births
Living people
People from Borlänge Municipality
Sportspeople from Dalarna County
Junior World Orienteering Championships medalists